Enis Maljici (born 5 April 1994) is a Swedish footballer who plays for Kortedala IF as a midfielder.

References

External links

1994 births
Living people
Association football midfielders
GAIS players
Swedish footballers
Utsiktens BK players